Hyptiocheta is a genus of flies in the family Dolichopodidae, known from Peru. It contains only one species, Hyptiocheta convexa.

References 

Dolichopodidae genera
Sympycninae
Diptera of South America
Invertebrates of Peru
Monotypic Diptera genera
Taxa named by Theodor Becker